Noji is a surname. Notable people with the surname include:

Józef Noji (1909–1943), Polish long-distance runner
Minae Noji (born 1973), Japanese-American actress
Rick Noji (born 1967), American high jumper